The 2007 AF2 season was the eighth season of the AF2. It was preceded by 2006 and succeeded by 2008. The regular season began on Friday, March 30 and ended on July 28.  The league champions were the Tulsa Talons, who defeated the Wilkes-Barre/Scranton Pioneers in ArenaCup VIII.

League info

Standings

 Green indicates clinched playoff berth
 Purple indicates division champion
 Grey indicates best conference record

Playoffs

ArenaCup VIII

ArenaCup VIII was the 2007 edition of the AF2's championship game, in which the National Conference Champions Tulsa Talons defeated the American Conference Champions Wilkes-Barre/Scranton Pioneers in Bossier City, Louisiana by a score of 73–66.

External links
 2007 af2 season
 All-af2 First & Second Team
 Arena Cup VIII Stats

Af2 seasons